Red Raw & Sore is a 1994 EP released by Raymond Watts (as PIG). Released exclusively in Japan, Red Raw & Sore contains two original tracks, "Red Raw & Sore" and "One Meatball", as well as three remixes of songs from The Swining, "Rope", "Blades" and "The Fountain of Miracles".  Red Raw & Sore was re-released in the United States in 1999 by Cleopatra Records as part of The Swining/Red Raw & Sore.

Track listing
 "Red Raw & Sore" – 5:40
 "Rope (Keith LeBlanc Remix)" – 4:32
 "Blades (KMFDM Mix)" – 6:32
 "The Fountain of Miracles (PIG Remix)" – 6:35
 "One Meatball" – 5:19

All tracks written by Raymond Watts, except track 1 written by Raymond Watts and Steve White.

Personnel
Raymond Watts
Steve White – guitar
Karl Hyde – guitar
Enrico Thomaso – trumpet

Pig (musical project) albums
1994 EPs